Baron Franciscus Eduardus Maria (Franz) Courtens (1854–1943) was a Belgian painter.

He was a leading figure in the Dendermonde School, famous for his paintings of nature and landscapes. An essay on him by Fernand Khnopff was published in The International Studio 34 (1908). Courtens was professor at the Royal Academy of Fine Arts (NHISKA) in Antwerp from 1904 till 1924.

He was a personal friend of Leopold II, who gave him the privilege of free access to the royal Parc of Laeken. Some of his paintings stil remain in the Royal collection.

Family 
Since 1922, the family belongs to the Belgian nobility.

Baron Franz Courtens:painter, member of Royal Academy of Science, Letters and Fine Arts of Belgium, 1904.
 Baron Hermann Courtens, (1884-1956): painter
 Baron Pierre Courtens, (1921-2004): artist
Jacques Courtens, (1926-1988): painter
 Alfred Courtens, (1889-1967): sculptor
Antoine Courtens, (1899-1969): architect, studied with Baron Victor Horta,

Honours 
 1922: created Baron Courtens by Royal order.
 Grand Officer in the Order of the Crown.
 Member of the Royal Academy of Science, Letters and Fine Arts of Belgium.

References

External links 

Centre Marius Staquet  Franz Courtens - Le plein air et l'intine 
Franz Courtens  ULAN Full Record Display. Union List of Artist Names, Getty Vocabularies. Getty Vocabulary Program, Getty Research Institute (Los Angeles, California)

Members of the Royal Academy of Belgium
People from Dendermonde
Barons of Belgium
Grand Officers of the Order of the Crown (Belgium)
1854 births
1943 deaths
19th-century Belgian painters
19th-century Belgian male artists
20th-century Belgian painters
20th-century Belgian male artists